The "Party All Goddamn Night" EP is the third EP by Andrew W.K., released in 2011 only in Japan. None of the songs featured on this EP had previously been released, apart from "I'm a Vagabond" which was featured on the 2010 album Mother of Mankind and was also released as a single in the UK, and "I Was Born To Love You" which had been released as a single on Japanese iTunes in January 2011.

Track listing

Notes
Around the time of release, Andrew W.K. had revealed on his website that some of the songs featured on this EP will also be featured on an upcoming studio album. While no songs were directly reused, the song "Everybody's Raging" was reworked into "Ever Again" for his 2018 album You're Not Alone. "I Sold My Soul" would later be reworked and re-recorded as "Not Anymore" which features as a bonus track on the CD version of Andrew W.K.'s 2021 album "God Is Partying".
We're All Women was written when Andrew was paired with Pedro Yanowitz at Fools Banquet, a song writing retreat hosted by Hanson in 2007. It was originally roughly recorded and then was re-recorded for the EP version.

References

Announcement page on the official Andrew W.K. website: http://www.andrewwk.com/news/the-party-all-goddamn-night-ep
Andrew W.K.'s official Japanese website: http://www.universal-music.co.jp/u-pop/artist/andrew/uice1174.html

2011 EPs
Andrew W.K. albums